Misery Index can refer to:

Economics 
Misery index (economics), adding the unemployment rate to the inflation rate

Entertainment 
Misery Index (band), a death metal band from Baltimore
Misery Index (album), a 1997 album by grindcore band Assück
The Misery Index (TV series), an American television series
The Misery Index: Notes from the Plague Years, a 2006 album by Boysetsfire